Slipway Fires is the third album by English indie rock band Razorlight. It was released on 3 November 2008.

The first single from the album, "Wire to Wire", was released on 26 September 2008. It was premiered by Zane Lowe on BBC Radio 1 on 8 September 2008, and peaked at number 5 on the UK Singles Chart.

The second single taken from the album was "Hostage of Love", released on 12 January 2009.

Reception

Slipway Fires was met with "mixed or average" reviews from critics. At Metacritic, which assigns a weighted average rating out of 100 to reviews from mainstream publications, this release received an average score of 52 based on 15 reviews.

In a review for AllMusic, Andrew Leahey wrote: "Slipway Fires is Razorlight's most mainstream release to date, an album that downplays the band's garage-rock past for something akin to Snow Patrol's adult-approved pop. Enjoying Slipway Fires requires a suspension of disbelief, a conscious separation between the band's past and the (somewhat ludicrous) present." Drowned in Sound described it as "a headachey throb of over-production and excessive sentiment" and "about as indie as Margaret Thatcher", while the NME described them as "just a boringly competent indie band masquerading as, at best, Fleetwood Mac and, at worst, Whitesnake".

Writing for The Austin Chronicle, Raoul Hernandez explained: "Razorlight's Slipway Fires manages a glow even in low light. Between the two best tracks that bookend the UK quartet's third LP struggles an album slighter than the last, which was already thinner than the first."

Track listing

Personnel
Produced, engineered and mixed by Mike Crossey
Engineered by Antonio and Nick Cervonaro
Assistant engineer: Adrian Breakspear
Recorded at The Fish Factory and Air Studios, London
Mixed at The Engine Room (Miloco Studios), London
Mastered by Robin Schmidt at 24-96 Mastering
Cover photography by Paul Rider, Johnny Photo and David Ellis
Sleeve conceived by JB and Colly
Art direction and design by Colly

Charts

Weekly charts

Year-end charts

References

Razorlight albums
2008 albums
Vertigo Records albums